William Joseph O'Brien (born 27 September 1887; date of death unknown) was an Australian rules footballer who played with St Kilda in the Victorian Football League (VFL).

O'Brien enlisted for part-time duty in the Volunteer Defence Corps during World War II at the age of 55.

Notes

External links 

1887 births
Australian rules footballers from Victoria (Australia)
St Kilda Football Club players
Williamstown Football Club players
Year of death missing
Volunteer Defence Corps soldiers